Kolayır or Kolair may refer to:
Kolayır, Agstafa, Azerbaijan
Kolayır, Barda, Azerbaijan
Kolayır, Samukh, Azerbaijan